Annick Alane (5 September 1925 – 28 October 2019) was a French film, television, and theatre actress from Carnac.

Filmography

1957: Les Truands (directed by Carlo Rim)
1965: Les Pieds dans le plâtre (directed by Jacques Fabbri and Pierre Lary)
1969: Hibernatus (directed by Édouard Molinaro) - Madame Crépin-Jaujard - la mère d'Evelyne
1971: Le Petit Matin (directed by Jean-Gabriel Albicocco) - Soeur Marie-Émilienne
1971: La Cavale (directed by Michel Mitrani)
1974: La Gifle (directed by Claude Pinoteau) - La femme de ménage de Jean
1977: Comme sur des roulettes (directed by Nina Companeez) - La femme de l'agence
1977: La Nuit de Saint-Germain-des-Prés (directed by Bob Swaim) - Hélène
1978: Passe ton bac d'abord (directed by Maurice Pialat) - La mère
1981: Pour la peau d'un flic (directed by Alain Delon) - Isabelle Pigot
1982: Qu'est-ce qu'on attend pour être heureux! (directed by Coline Serreau) - Lulu
1983: L'Homme blessé (directed by Patrice Chéreau) - Henri's mother
1983: Garçon! (directed by Claude Sautet) - Jeannette, la femme d'un retraité grincheux
1984: Une Américaine à Paris (directed by Rick Rosenthal) - Givenchy Saleswoman
1984: La Septième Cible (directed by Claude Pinoteau) - Gabrielle, l'amie de Mme Grimaldi
1985: Parking (directed by Jacques Demy) - Lucienne
1985: La Baston (directed by ) - Yvonne Levasseur
1985: Trois hommes et un couffin (directed by Coline Serreau) - La pharmacienne
1987: Promis... juré! (directed by Jacques Monnet) - Marguerite Hamon
1989:  (directed by Jacques Rouffio) - Juliette
1991: La Totale! (directed by Claude Zidi) - Pascaline
1992: La Crise (directed by Coline Serreau) - Mamie
1993: Germinal (directed by Claude Berri) - Madame Grégoire
1995: Les Trois Frères (directed by Didier Bourdon and Bernard Campan) - Geneviève Rougemont
1998: Le Monde de Marty (directed by Denis Bardiau) - Suzanne Berrant
2001: Mortel transfert (directed by Jean-Jacques Beineix) (role cut from film)
2003: 18 ans après (directed by Coline Serreau) - La pharmacienne
2004: Vipère au poing (directed by Philippe de Broca) - Mme Rézeau
2004: Les Couilles de mon chat (Short, directed by Didier Bénureau)
2008: Deux jours à tuer (directed by Jean Becker) - Madame Lemoine
2009: La femme invisible (d'après une histoire vraie) (directed by Agathe Teyssier) - Mémé
2011: Crimes en sourdine (directed by Joël Chalude) - Mme Garcia II
2012: La clinique de l'amour! (directed by Artus de Penguern) - Madame Santiago
2012: The Suicide Shop (directed by Patrice Leconte) - La petite dame âgée / La petite dame 2 (voice)

Television 
1960: Au fil de l'histoire (Les Cinq Dernières Minutes)
1972: Schulmeister, espion de l'empereur - Mme Fouché
1981: Pause Café
1981: Julien Fontanes, magistrat (directed by François Dupont-Midi) - Zoutie
1984: Emmenez-moi au théâtre (Croque Monsieur) - Valérie
1988: Pause Café, Pause Tendresse
1990: Les Mouettes (TV Movie) - Finette
1998: Le comte de Monte-Cristo - Vieille Femme
2004: Louis la brocante - Soeur Suzanne
2009: Joséphine, ange gardien (TV Series, 1 Episode: "Police blues") - Madame Heuchel

Theatre 
1951: Une nuit à Megève, Théâtre Michel
1955: Le Quai Conti, Théâtre Gramont
1962: The Merry Wives of Windsor, Théâtre de l'Ambigu-Comique
1963: La Grande Oreille, Théâtre de Paris
1963: Les Femmes savantes, Théâtre de l'Ambigu-Comique
1964: L'Aquarium, Théâtre de Paris
1965: La Grande Oreille, Théâtre de Paris
1965: L'Envers d'une conspiration, Théâtre de Paris
1965: Je veux voir Mioussov, Théâtre des Nouveautés
1968: Les Hussards, Théâtre de Paris
1972: Huit Femmes, Théâtre de la Madeleine
1974: Et à la fin était le bang, Théâtre de l'Atelier
1975: Les Secrets de la Comédie humaine, Théâtre du Palais-Royal
1975: L'Autre Valse, Théâtre des Variétés
1977: Féfé de Broadway, Théâtre des Variétés
1979: Je veux voir Mioussov, Théâtre du Palais-Royal
1981: Pauvre France, Théâtre du Palais-Royal
1988: Douce Nuit, National Theatre of Strasbourg
1991: Cœur ardent, National Theatre of Brittany
1992: Les Dimanches de Monsieur Riley, Théâtre de l'Œuvre
1994: La Folle de Chaillot, Maison de la Culture de Loire-Atlantique in Nantes
1996: Lapin lapin, Théâtre de la Porte Saint-Martin
1998: Il est important d'être fidèle, Théâtre des Champs-Élysées
1998: Délicate Balance, Théâtre Antoine
2000: La Chatte sur un toit brûlant, Théâtre de la Renaissance
2001: La Jalousie, Théâtre Edouard VII
2002: Etat critique, Théâtre Fontaine
2004: Grosse Chaleur, Théâtre de la Renaissance
2006: Le Jardin, Théâtre des Mathurins
2008: La Tectonique des sentiments, Théâtre Marigny

 Awards and nominations 
1993: Nomination – Molière Award for Best Supporting Actress for Les Dimanches de Monsieur Riley1994: Molière Award for Best Supporting Actress for Tailleur pour dames2001: Molière Award for Best Supporting Actress for La Chatte sur un toit brûlant2003: Nomination – Molière Award for Best Supporting Actress for État critique''

References

External links
 

1925 births
2019 deaths
People from Carnac
French film actresses
French television actresses
French stage actresses
20th-century French actresses
21st-century French actresses